Marcus Walker may refer to:

Marcus Walker (basketball) (born 1986), American basketball player
Marcus Walker (rugby league) (born 2002), English rugby league footballer
Marcus Walker, a fictional character on the American television series Scandal